Bombus is a GPL  instant messaging client for the XMPP protocol. It is written in Java, and runs on Java ME/MIDP capable cellphones, including Windows Mobile platform with installed Java ME virtual machine, or any other platform, where Java ME is available. There was successful compilations of Bombue for Android.

There are also early preview snapshots of the separate project called Bombus-NG made by the same author. Bombus-NG is a native Windows Mobile XMPP client, which does not require the installation of .NET Framework runtime.

Availability
Official website provides ready-to-install JAR/JAD files for Java platform and CAB for Windows Mobile via OTA feature of cellphones. Source code of both Java and WM projects are available via Subversion repository.

Features
 Bombus uses available network connection to connect to XMPP server for transferring data to server and users. It can use WAP/GPRS provided by mobile network operator as well as WiFi network connection on suitable mobile devices.
 Bombus completely implements XMPP Core specifications and a lot of XMPP extensions, as major desktop XMPP clients. It also provides Stream Compression extension - the most essential feature for GPRS users - it can reduce network traffic costs up to 10 times comparing with plain XMPP connection. Secured server connection is also available, if cellphone support it.
 User interface can be easy customized with skins, emoticons, which are compatible (or easy to convert) with desktop clients such as Psi, Gajim, Tkabber, QIP, etc. The official website offers a web application called online constructor, which allows the user to choose graphical skins and emoticons packs, and builds ready-to-install JAR file with customized interface.

Third-party modifications
Due to opensource nature, Bombus has custom modifications (or forks) from different volunteers, with some UI improvements, additional XMPP features (such as Geolocation support, or SOCKS5 file transfer between users), etc. Most important features and bugfixes are merged in main Bombus code after author's approval. Such modifications as BombusMod have large code and UI improvements.

References

 XMPP Software: Clients

External links
 Bombus project homepage

Free XMPP clients
Free instant messaging clients
Java platform software
Symbian instant messaging clients